is an Echizen Railway Katsuyama Eiheiji Line railway station located in the town of Eiheiji, Yoshida District, Fukui Prefecture, Japan.

Lines

Station layout
The station consists of two opposed side platforms connected by a level crossing. The station is staffed. The wooden station building is protected by the government as a Registered Tangible Cultural Property.

Adjacent stations

History
Matsuoka Station was opened on February 11, 1914. Operations were halted from June 25, 2001. The station reopened on July 20, 2003 as an Echizen Railway station.

Surrounding area
The station is in the midst of a residential and commercial area on the edge of Eiheiji Town's central area.
Eiheiji Town Hall is a short distance west of the station.
 passes to the south.

See also
 List of railway stations in Japan

References

External links

  

Railway stations in Fukui Prefecture
Railway stations in Japan opened in 1914
Katsuyama Eiheiji Line
Eiheiji, Fukui